The Doctor of Musical Arts (DMA) is a doctoral academic degree in music. The DMA combines advanced studies in an applied area of specialization (usually music performance, music composition, or conducting) with graduate-level academic study in subjects such as music history, music theory, or Music education. The DMA degree usually takes about three to four years of full-time study to complete (in addition to the master's and bachelor's degrees), preparing students to be professional performers, conductors, and composers. As a terminal degree, the DMA qualifies its recipient to work in university, college, and conservatory teaching/research positions. Students seeking doctoral training in musicology or music theory typically enter a DME or Ph.D. program, rather than a DMA program.

Terminology
The degree is also abbreviated as DMusA or AMusD. For the related degree Doctor of Music, the abbreviation is DM or DMus. For the related degree Doctor of Arts, the abbreviation DA is used.

Types
A large number of US institutions offer the DMA degree. The Ph.D. and DME is generally considered to be more research oriented, while other doctorates may  place more emphasis on practical applications and/or include a performance component. Such distinctions among degree types are not always so clear-cut, however. For instance, most programs include traditional research training and culminate in a written dissertation, regardless of degree designation. The music education degree can be a DME, DMA or Ph.D., each comprising similar research-oriented programs. Also, music education Ph.D. programs may include performance-oriented tracks. In composition, one may study for either the DMA or the PhD, depending on the institution. The Ph.D. is the standard doctorate in music theory, musicology, music therapy, and ethnomusicology.

Sacred music
A related program is the Doctor of Sacred Music (DSM), also Sacrae Musica Doctor (SMD), which tends to be awarded by seminaries or university music schools that focus on church music, choral conducting and organ performance.  In the past, some seminaries titled the degree Doctor of Church Music (DCM).  Only one US institution, Claremont Graduate University still offers the DCM degree, in addition to the more typical DMA. The vast majority of US seminaries have closed their music doctorate programs, but some still offer a Master of Arts or Master of Sacred Music degree. A new program offered at Perkins School of Theology is the Doctor of Pastoral Music (DPM).  While more theology-based and housed within the Doctor of Ministry (D.Min.) program, admission to the degree requires applicants to hold a Master of Music (MMus), Master of Sacred Music (MSM), Master of Church Music (MCM), MA in church music or equivalent 48-semester-hour degree recognized by the National Association of Schools of Music.

History 
The Doctor of Musical Arts (DMA), and Doctor of Music Education (DME) is widely available in combination of degrees in performance (sometimes with a specialization in instrumental or voice pedagogy and/or music literature), composition, conducting, and music education. Some universities awarding doctoral degrees in these areas use the title Doctor of Music (DM or DMus) or Doctor of Arts (DA) or Doctor in Musical Studies (Ph.D.) instead of DMA. The DMA degree was pioneered by Howard Hanson and the National Association of Schools of Music, who approved the first DMA programs in 1952. Northwestern University, the University of Michigan, and the Eastman School of Music became the first to offer the DMA.  Boston University offered its first DMA program in 1955. In 2005, Boston University also expanded into online music education by launching the first online doctoral degree in music, a DMA program (along with a Master of Music program) in music education.

In 1952, after six years of deliberation, the National Association of Schools of Music (NASM) approved thirty-two schools for graduate degrees for graduate work "in one or more of the fields into which graduate music study has been divided." The NASM was, and still is, the only accrediting agency for music schools recognized by the American Council on Education. In 1952, 143 music schools had already established standards for undergraduate degrees. The national launch of DMA by institutions meeting criteria was 1953.

 Eastman School of Music (the DMA degree was approved by the State of New York Board of Regents in 1953)
 Boston University
 University of Southern California

The Director of the University of Rochester Eastman School of Music, Howard Hanson (1896–1981), who had been awarded an honorary doctorate in 1925, was one of several high-profile advocates of creating a performance-oriented doctoral degree. Hanson was the Chair of the NASM and Music Teachers National Association (MTNA) "Graduate Commission." This commission recommended that the terminal performance doctoral degree be established. This recommendation included that schools desiring to offer this degree seek the Graduate Commission's approval.

In 1953, he published a proposal for a Doctor of Musical Arts degree, which was roundly criticized by Paul Henry Lang, professor of musicology at Columbia University.

Early Doctor of Musical Arts degrees conferred
 1954: Mathias "Matt" Higgins Doran (born 1921), University of Southern California
 1955: Will Gay Bottje (born 1925), Eastman School of Music – some sources attribute Bottje as having been the first in the nation to earn the degree
 August 1955: Edward F. Gilday Jr., Boston University

Non-NASM institutions

The alumni of Music conservatories in the United States also seek positions at universities.  The conservatories that are not affiliated with the National Association of Schools of Music began offering DMAs in the late 1960s.

 1971: Margaret Hee-Leng Tan, Juilliard – she is the first woman to earn a DMA from Juilliard; Juilliard added the degree in 1969, the year it moved to Lincoln Center

References

Musical Arts, Doctor
Vocational education
Musicology
Performing arts education
Humanities education
Music education